Gillian Audrey Mackay (born 1991) is a Scottish Green politician who has served as a Member of the Scottish Parliament (MSP) for the Central Scotland region since the 2021 Scottish Parliament election. She is the first Green MSP ever to be elected in Central Scotland.

Raised in Grangemouth, she is a graduate in marine biodiversity and biotechnology from Heriot-Watt University. She has the sensory disorder Ménière's disease.

Political career 
Mackay first entered politics with an internship with the Scottish Greens at Holyrood. She received the internship through a program which aimed to support disabled people in politics. She subsequently went on to become a Regional Campaign Support Officer for the Lothian region.

Prior to being elected to the Scottish Parliament, Mackay was an unsuccessful candidate in the Linlithgow and East Falkirk constituency in the 2019 UK general election, and also stood in the 2017 City of Edinburgh Council election and the 2019 European Parliament election in the United Kingdom.

She is the Scottish Greens' spokesperson for health and social care.

Personal life 
Her mother Audrey was a music teacher in Falkirk. She has a sister, a brother and a partner.

References

External links 
 

1991 births
Living people
Female members of the Scottish Parliament
Scottish Green Party MSPs
Members of the Scottish Parliament 2021–2026
Alumni of Heriot-Watt University
People from Grangemouth
People with Ménière's Disease